Les Palmer (16 December 1923 – December 2002) was an English professional footballer who made one appearance in the Football League for Barrow.

References 

English Football League players
English footballers
Association football wing halves
1923 births
2002 deaths
Footballers from Barrow-in-Furness
Barrow A.F.C. players
Clapton Orient F.C. wartime guest players
Footballers from Cumbria